Mel Metcalfe is an American sound engineer. He has been nominated for an Academy Award in the Best Sound category three times:  in 1987, for Star Trek IV: The Voyage Home; in 1992, for Beauty and the Beast; and in 1993, for Aladdin.

Notable work

 Star Trek IV: The Voyage Home (1986)
 Rain Man (1988)
 The Little Mermaid (1989)
 The Rescuers Down Under (1990)
 Beauty and the Beast (1991)
 Aladdin (1992)
 Homeward Bound: The Incredible Journey (1993)
 The Three Musketeers (1993)
 The Lion King (1994)
 Houseguest (1995)
 A Goofy Movie (1995)
 A Pyromaniac's Love Story (1995)
 Pocahontas (1995)
 Operation Dumbo Drop (1995)
 Father of the Bride Part II (1995)
 Mr. Holland's Opus (1995)
 Homeward Bound II: Lost in San Francisco (1996)
 Eddie (1996)
 The Hunchback of Notre Dame (1996)
 2 Days in the Valley (1996)
 101 Dalmatians (1996)
 Metro (1997)
 Anna Karenina (1997)
 George of the Jungle (1997)
 Rocket Man (1997)
 Flubber (1997)
 Mr. Magoo (1997)
 Mulan (1998)
 Holy Man (1998)
 10 Things I Hate About You (1999)
 Instinct (1999)
 Inspector Gadget (1999)
 Teaching Mrs. Tingle (1999)
 Music of the Heart (1999)
 Dinosaur (2000)
 Disney's The Kid (2000)
 The Emperor's New Groove (2000)
 The Majestic (2001)
 Lilo & Stitch (2002)
 The Santa Clause 2 (2002)
 Treasure Planet (2002)
 Home on the Range (2004)

References

External links

Year of birth missing (living people)
Living people
American audio engineers
Emmy Award winners
Place of birth missing (living people)
Walt Disney Animation Studios people